Georges Carbasse (born 29 September 1944) is a French former wrestler who competed in the 1972 Summer Olympics.

References

External links
 

1944 births
Living people
Olympic wrestlers of France
Wrestlers at the 1972 Summer Olympics
French male sport wrestlers